The Budapesti Honvéd SE Swimming section was created in 1950 and is one of the most successful athletics teams in Hungary. Homeground and training place are the club's own Honvéd Sportuszoda.

Achievements

Notable athletes

  Tamás Deutsch
  András Hargitay
  Kristóf Milák
  Imre Nyéki
  Csaba Sós
  József Szabó
  Liliána Szilágyi
  György Tumpek
  Zoltán Verrasztó

References

External links
Club website 
Official Budapesti Honvéd SE website  

Swimming in Hungary
Swim teams
Sport in Budapest
Sports clubs established in 1950